Russell Howard & Mum (known as Russell Howard & Mum: USA Road Trip in series 1 and 2, and Russell Howard & Mum: Globetrotters in series 3 and 4) is a British comedy/travel series presented by comedian Russell Howard.

The series was commissioned in April 2016. The first episode was broadcast on Comedy Central on 19 October 2016. A second series began on 26 March 2018.

A third series titled Russell Howard & Mum: Globetrotters began on 23 January 2019. A fourth series began on 9 October 2019

In 2021, Howard began a new travelogue series for Sky One called Russell Howard Stands Up To The World, which saw the comedian on tour in Australia and New Zealand, where he met Sam Neill and tried the manu bomb diving manoeuvre.

Premise
The series features Howard and his mother, Ninette, travelling across America and meeting people with unusual hobbies and obsessions.

Episode guide

References

External links
 

2010s British comedy television series
2016 British television series debuts
British travel television series
Comedy Central (British TV channel) original programming
English-language television shows
Television shows set in the United States